Kapil Dev was appointed the Indian national cricket coach in September 1999 following the appointment of Sachin Tendulkar as captain of the Indian team in August 1999. As a player, Kapil Dev captained the team to their first Cricket World Cup victory in 1983. When he retired in 1994, he was the most capped Indian Test player, the holder of record for the highest number of Test wickets (434) and had earlier held the record for the highest number of wickets in ODIs as well. Due to his credentials as player and captain, he was appointed as the coach ahead of teammate Kris Srikkanth. The team saw success in his first series at home against New Zealand but saw whitewash in the subsequent test series against host tour of Australia and visitors South Africa, India's first home series loss in 12 years. India's 3–2 win in the subsequent ODI series under new captain Sourav Ganguly will forever be remembered for the claims of match-fixing against South Africa's captain Hansie Cronje.

As the match-fixing scandal took centrestage, former player Manoj Prabhakar accused Kapil Dev of trying to bribe him in 1994 during a tournament in Sri Lanka. Under severe pressure from politicians and fans, Kapil Dev resigned as coach in September 2000, after having spent less than one year as the team coach. The reports of CBI (India's premier investigating agency) and K. Madhavan (appointed by BCCI to investigate match-fixing allegations) in November 2000 exonerated Kapil Dev of any involvement in match-fixing. India's performance in the coaching stint of Kapil Dev was below-par, winning just one Test match (out of 8 played) and 9 ODIs (out of 25 played).

India's performance

New Zealand tour of India 
Kapil Dev was appointed coach of the Indian national cricket team in 1999 succeeding Anshuman Gaekwad. His appointment coincided with the second term of captaincy for Tendulkar. Kapil's first international competition as India's coach started badly with the team bowled out for 83 all out against the visiting New Zealand team in Mohali. Due to an inspired bowling display by Javagal Srinath, the lead was restricted to 132 runs after New Zealand were dismissed for 215. India's batsmen bounced back in the second innings with a total of 505 with all the top five batsmen passing fifty and Rahul Dravid and Tendulkar scoring centuries. Anil Kumble's ten-wicket match haul at Kanpur enabled India to win the second Test match. The Third Test ended in a draw, with Tendulkar recording his first double-century in Test Cricket. In the ensuing ODI Series, India won 3–2 and the highlight for Indian team was a world record ODI partnership of 331 runs between Dravid and Tendulkar in the 2nd match at Hyderabad.  The series against New Zealand would be Kapil's most successful series as national coach.

Indian tour of Australia
India followed the NZ tour with a trip to Australia. India lost the Test series 3–0 and the margin of defeat was heavy in each of these matches – 285 runs, 180 runs, innings and 141 runs. The highlight of the Test series came in the final Test when V. V. S. Laxman scored 167 at a run a ball in fading light at the Sydney Cricket Ground and came for much praise from the media. India's ODI series performance matched the Test series in failure as India managed to win just one match against Pakistan and Kapil had to come out in defense of his team.

South Africa tour of India
India had not lost a home test series since 1987 (against Pakistan) and when South Africa toured India in February – March 2000, that streak was ended as India lost the home series 2–0. However events outside the field overshadowed the cricket: Before start of the series, Tendulkar announced his decision to relinquish the captaincy after the Test matches, Azharuddin and Mongia were recalled to the team, controversy arose over Azharuddin's injury leading to his exclusion from the First Test. Ganguly was made the captain of the Indian team for the one-day series. Talks in the media about no way but 'UP' were not unfounded when India took a 2–0 lead in the ODI Series and finishing the series at 3–2, after South Africa won the last two matches. It was learnt later that South Africa's captain Cronje was involved in betting and there were attempts to buy-off South African players by Cronje and bookmakers. At the end of the series, the media felt that Ganguly's attitude and captaincy was heartening. In March 2000, India participated in a triangular series with South Africa and Pakistan. India won only one of their four matches and missed the finals.

Match Fixing Allegation and Resignation

Background
As the 1999/00 cricket season was winding down, the Delhi Police shocked the cricket world when they announced that Cronje was involved in a "Cricket Match-fixing and Betting Racket". The UCBSA released terse statements denying the allegations triggering a diplomatic row. When Delhi Police began mounting evidence, Cronje admitted to accepting money for throwing away games in a phone call with UCBSA's chief Ali Bacher. Cronje was sacked and replaced by Shaun Pollock.

Manoj Prabhakar's allegations
Former Indian player Prabhakar also publicly claimed that Kapil wanted to throw away a match against Pakistan. Prabhakar's allegations against an unknown team member was not new as he made these allegations to a magazine The Outlook in 1997 based on which BCCI instituted the Chandrachud Inquiry, a one-man commission headed by retired Chief Justice of India Yeshwant Vishnu Chandrachud. Prabhakar did not reveal names or provide evidence of his charges (match fixing and phone tapping allegation on then cricket manager Ajit Wadekar). When the match fixing controversy resurfaced in 2000, BCCI released the Chandrachud Report to the media. The reaction of the Indian public resulted in PILs and International Cricket Council and the BCCI were called to respond in the Delhi and Calcutta High Courts. In response to the crisis, the Indian government initiated a CBI inquiry on 28 April 2000. Former BCCI President Inderjit Singh Bindra revealed on 4 May 2000 that Prabhakar told him that Kapil asked him to throw away the match. During the ensuing exchanges between various parties, Kapil Dev broke down in an interview on BBC's Hard Talk with Karan Thapar.

Kapil's resignation
Kapil initially did not resign or take a leave of absence, from his coaching responsibilities. As the weeks progressed and as public discontent mounting on inaction in the match-fixing scandal and in no small measure the pressure from the then Union Sport Minister Shukdev Singh Dhindsa, Kapil Dev resigned from his position of Indian Cricket Coach on 12 September 2000 vowing farewell to the game of cricket.

Clearing of match-fixing charges

After extensive investigation and interviews, the CBI submitted its report to Union Sports Minister on 1 November 2000. The report found that there was 
"no credible evidence" against Kapil. The BCCI's anti-corruption officer K Madhavan (former Joint Director of CBI) submitted his report on 28 November 2000 in which he elaborated on players who were found to have links with the match-fixing syndicate. Madhavan concluded that Kapil did not attempt to bribe Prabhakar and none of the players corroborated with Prabhakar's version of the events.

Legacy of Kapil's coaching 
Kapil's term as Indian cricket team's national coach was not considered a success due to poor on-field performances. During Kapil's reign as National Coach, India performed badly in away matches and managed just 3 victories in 15 games (20%) in ODI Tournaments. In Test cricket, India lost its first home series in 13 years and managed just 1 victory in 3 Test series.

{| class="wikitable"
!colspan=6|Indian Performance with Kapil Dev as Coach
|-
! Matches!! Total !! Won !! Lost !! Draw/Tie !! % Win 
|-
| Test Cricket|| 8|| 1|| 5|| 2|| 12.5%
|-
| ODI matches|| 25|| 9|| 16|| 0|| 44%
|}

References

Coaches of the Indian national cricket team